Blaze of Glory is the tenth studio album by English rock and roll singer Joe Jackson, released in 1989. Jackson has stated that the album and the songs themselves were an examination of his generation as the 1980s were ending, ranging from the optimism of the 1950s ("Tomorrow's World") to the politics of terrorism ("Rant and Rave") and the Cold War ("Evil Empire"), to yuppies ("Discipline") and rockers who are well past their prime ("Nineteen Forever"). The title track compares the legacy of a classic rock musician who died young ("...went out in a blaze of glory") with the current wannabes ("They're just cartoons" who "think they're Superman" but "can't even fly").

Although Blaze of Glory was a modest seller, the resultant single "Nineteen Forever" reached No. 4 in the US Hot Modern Rock Tracks chart. Jackson felt the album was one of his best efforts and toured to perform and support it with an eleven piece band in the U.S. and Europe from June to November 1989, and was disappointed with both the critical and commercial reaction as well as his record label's lack of support.

Track listing 
All songs written, arranged and produced by Joe Jackson.

Personnel 
 Musicians
 Joe Jackson – lead and backing vocals, organ, piano, synthesizers
 Ed Roynesdal – synthesizer, vibraphone, Hammond organ, violin
 Graham Maby – bass guitar, backing vocals
 Rick Ford – bass guitar, fretless bass guitar
 Tom Teeley – electric and acoustic 6-string guitars, backing vocals
 Vinnie Zummo – electric, acoustic and nylon 6 and 12-string guitars, electric sitar
 Gary Burke – drums
 Sue Hadjopoulos – congas
 Joy Askew – lead and backing vocals
 Drew Barfield – lead and backing vocals
 Chris Hunter – alto saxophone
 Tony Aiello – tenor saxophone
 Steve Elson – baritone saxophone
 Michael Morreale – trumpet
 Tony Barrero – trumpet
 Charlie Gordon – trombone
 Glenn Dicterow – violin
 Anthony Cox – acoustic bass
 Charles McCracken – cello

 Production
 Joe Jackson – arrangements, producer
 Ed Roynesdal – co-producer, sampling, Kurzweil K250 sequencer
 Joe Barbaria – recording engineer
 Gene Orloff – orchestra conductor
 Frank Orlinsky, Pat Gorman, Richard Frankel – art direction
 Sandra Haber, Laura Levine – photography

Charts

Weekly charts

Year-end charts

References

External links 
 Blaze of Glory album information at The Joe Jackson Archive

1989 albums
Joe Jackson (musician) albums
A&M Records albums